"(I'm So) Afraid of Losing You Again" is a song written by Dallas Frazier and A.L. "Doodle" Owens, and recorded by American country music artist Charley Pride.  It was released in October 1969 as the first single from the album Just Plain Charley.  The song was Pride's second number one on the country charts.  The single stayed at number one for three weeks and spent a total of 15 weeks on the country charts.

Chart performance

References

1969 singles
Charley Pride songs
Songs written by Dallas Frazier
Songs written by A.L. "Doodle" Owens
Song recordings produced by Jack Clement
RCA Records singles
1969 songs